Cathedral Gorge State Park is a public recreation area and geologic preserve featuring a dramatic landscape of eroded soft bentonite clay covering almost  in Lincoln County, Nevada.

History

The site has been popular with local picnickers since the nineteenth century, when it was known as Cathedral Gulch. During the 1920s, its dramatic landscape provided a background for open-air plays and annual Easter ceremonies. Governor James Scrugham began acquiring and setting aside the area for preservation in 1924. It subsequently became one of the four original Nevada state parks created in 1935. Members of the Civilian Conservation Corps built picnicking facilities that are still in use as well as a stone water tower and stone restroom which are no longer in operation.

Natural features

Climate
Rainfall is variable and thunderstorms prevalent.

Geology
A majority of Meadow Valley (which lies along U.S. Route 93 from the towns of Caliente to Panaca) was covered by a freshwater lake nearly 5 million years ago during the Pliocene Era. The richly colored canyons of Cathedral Gorge (called the Panaca Formation) are remnants of this ancient lakebed. Over centuries, the lake began to gradually drain. Erosion began working away at the exposed portions of sediment and gravel that once composed the lake bottom. Rainwater and melting snow carved rivulets in the soft siltstone and clay shale, splitting tiny cracks and fissures into larger and larger gullies and canyons.

Plants
In areas below the eroded escarpment (dubbed the "Badland") it is difficult for plant life to take root in the constantly eroding clay. However, away from the clay, the park's diverse soil types allow various plant associations to grow. Fragile sand dunes are held firm thanks to a wide array of wildflowers and grasses, such as dune primroses and Indian ricegrass. Within the valley center, clay, sand, and gravel have melded to form a rich, granulated soil that encourages the growth of the following species: narrowleaf yucca, juniper trees, barberry sagebrush, greasewood, white sage, shadscale, four-winged saltbush. Rabbitbrush finds sanctuary in disturbed areas, such as roadsides and walkways. Very few species of cactus can tolerate the climate in Cathedral Gorge, where temperatures in winter can fall below freezing, and rise above  in summer. Other trees, not native to the park, have been planted around the campground to provide shade.

Animals
Small mammals form a majority of the park's animal population: black-tailed jackrabbits, cottontail rabbits, coyotes, gophers, kangaroo rats, kit foxes, mice, and skunks. Deer can be observed infrequently near Miller Point during the late fall and winter. Birds are seen frequently around camp areas and near dense patches of shrubs. The natives include blackbirds, black-throated sparrows, finches, American kestrels, small hawks, ravens, roadrunners, American robins, sapsuckers, and introduced European starlings. Migratory birds include bluebirds, cedar waxwings, hummingbirds, and warblers. Various species of non-poisonous snakes and lizards are abundant. In the summer, the Great Basin rattlesnake may be spotted.

Activities and amenities
Known locally as "caves," the park's extremely narrow slot canyons were cut from the mud that lay at the bottom of the lake millions of years ago. Explorers can crawl through tunnels to discover hidden chambers in the network of canyons which offer some coolness in the summer heat.

Park facilities include a 22-site campground, ADA-accessible sites, group use area, restrooms and showers. A regional visitor center at the park entrance has interpretive displays and information about other parks in the area.

References

External links

Cathedral Gorge State Park Nevada State Parks
Cathedral Gorge State Park Trail Map Nevada State Parks

State parks of Nevada
Protected areas of Lincoln County, Nevada
Protected areas established in 1935
1935 establishments in Nevada
Civilian Conservation Corps in Nevada